The Australian cricket team toured New Zealand from 3 to 24 February 2016. Originally the tour was going to consist of three Test matches. In June 2015, New Zealand Cricket were in talks with Cricket Australia to have a tour consisting of two Tests and three One Day Internationals (ODIs). In August 2015, the fixtures were announced which contained the reduction of Tests from three to two and the addition of the three ODIs.

In December 2015 New Zealand captain Brendon McCullum announced that he would be retiring from all forms of international cricket at the conclusion of the series. New Zealand won the ODI series 2–1 to retain the Chappell–Hadlee Trophy. McCullum finished his ODI career with the best win–loss ratio of any New Zealander who has captained in ten or more matches. In his final match, McCullum broke the record for the fastest century scored in Test cricket. Australia won the Test series 2–0, to retain the Trans-Tasman Trophy and regain the number one position in the ICC Test Championship.

Adam Voges, who hit the winning runs, finished the Test series with a batting average of 95.50.

Squads

James Faulkner was ruled out of Australia's squad after suffering a hamstring injury in the first ODI. He was replaced by Marcus Stoinis. Kane Richardson was ruled out of the last two ODIs due to a back injury. He was replaced in the squad by Joel Paris. Mark Craig replaced Mitchell Santner after Santer was ruled out due to bone bruise in his left foot. Peter Siddle missed the second Test due to a back injury sustained in the first Test.

ODI series

1st ODI

2nd ODI

3rd ODI

Test series

1st Test

2nd Test

References

External links
 Series home at ESPN Cricinfo

2016 in Australian cricket
2016 in New Zealand cricket
International cricket competitions in 2015–16
Australian cricket tours of New Zealand